The Ministry of Health of the Czech Republic is a government ministry of the Czech Republic.

See also
Healthcare in the Czech Republic
Timeline of ministers on Wikidata

External links
 

Czech Republic
Health
Health in the Czech Republic
Czechia, Health